Sunken Rock is a sunken rock lying 0.2 nautical miles (0.4 km) north-northeast of Morgan Island, close off the north side of Heard Island. Surveyed and named by the ANARE (Australian National Antarctic Research Expeditions) in 1948.

References

Rock formations of Antarctica